The Dutch Catholic Printing Union (NKGB) was a trade union representing workers in the printing industry in the Netherlands.

The union was founded in 1902, as a counterpart to the secular General Dutch Typographers' Union.  In 1925, it was a founding affiliate of the Roman Catholic Workers' Federation, and it was then affiliated to its successors, the Catholic Workers' Movement and the Dutch Catholic Trade Union Federation (NKV).  By 1964, the union had 15,374 members.

In 1976, the NKV merged with its secular counterpart, to form the Dutch Federation of Trade Unions, and in 1982, the NKGB similarly merged with the General Dutch Printing Union, to form the Printing and Paper Union.

References

Catholic trade unions
Printing trade unions
Trade unions established in 1902
Trade unions disestablished in 1982
Trade unions in the Netherlands